The Diogenidae are a family of hermit crabs, sometimes known as "left-handed hermit crabs" because in contrast to most other hermit crabs, its left chela (claw) is enlarged instead of the right. It comprises 429 extant species, and a further 46 extinct species, making it the second-largest family of marine hermit crabs, after the  Paguridae.

Genera

Allodardanus Haig & Provenzano, 1965
Aniculus Dana, 1852
Areopaguristes Rahayu & McLaughlin, 2010
Annuntidiogenes † Fraaije, Van Bakel, Jagt & Artal, 2008
Bathynarius Forest, 1989
Calcinus Dana, 1851
Cancellus H. Milne-Edwards, 1836
Ciliopagurus Forest, 1995
Clibanarius Dana, 1852
Dardanus Paul’son, 1875
Diogenes Dana, 1851
Eocalcinus † Vía, 1959
Isocheles Stimpson, 1858
Loxopagurus Forest, 1964
Paguristes Dana, 1851
Paguropsis Henderson, 1888
Parapaguristes † Bishop, 1986
Petrochirus Stimpson, 1858
Pseudopaguristes McLaughlin, 2002
Pseudopagurus Forest, 1952
Stratiotes Thomson, 1899 – see Areopaguristes
Striadiogenes † Garassino, De Angeli & Pasini, 2009
Strigopagurus Forest, 1995
Tisea Morgan & Forest, 1991
Trizopagurus Forest, 1952

References

External links

 
Decapod families